Israel Oliver Peña (born 16 December 1987), known as Israel Oliver, is a swimmer from Spain.

Personal 
Oliver was born in Madrid. He has a disability: he has a vision impairment. In 2012, he lived in Carrizal de Wit, Las Palmas, Canary Islands.

Swimming 
Oliver was an S12/B2 type swimmer, but became a S11 swimmer.

Oliver raced competed at the 2004 Summer Paralympics, where he earned a silver medal in the 4 x 100 meters 49 points medley relay and a bronze in the 100 meter butterfly race. He raced at the 2008 Summer Paralympics.

In 2012, Oliver competed at the Paralympic Swimming Championship of Spain by Autonomous Communities, representing the Canary Islands.  He finished second in the SB12 100 meter breaststroke. He competed at the 2012 Summer Paralympics.  He finished fifth in the 100 meter breaststroke. Prior to heading to London, he participated in a national vision impaired swim team training camp at the High Performance Centre of Sant Cugat from 6 to 23 August.  Daily at the camp, there were two in water training sessions and one out of water training session. He competed at the 2013 IPC Swimming World Championships. In November 2013, he competed at the Spanish Age Swimming Championships for blind and visually impaired.

References

External links 
 
 

1987 births
Living people
Spanish male breaststroke swimmers
Spanish male butterfly swimmers
Spanish male freestyle swimmers
Spanish male medley swimmers
Paralympic swimmers of Spain
Paralympic swimmers with a vision impairment
Paralympic medalists in swimming
Paralympic gold medalists for Spain
Paralympic silver medalists for Spain
Paralympic bronze medalists for Spain
Swimmers at the 2008 Summer Paralympics
Swimmers at the 2004 Summer Paralympics
Swimmers at the 2012 Summer Paralympics
Swimmers at the 2016 Summer Paralympics
Medalists at the 2004 Summer Paralympics
Medalists at the 2016 Summer Paralympics
Medalists at the World Para Swimming Championships
Medalists at the World Para Swimming European Championships
S11-classified Paralympic swimmers
Spanish blind people